The Primera División de Fútbol Profesional Clausura 2007 season (officially "Clausura 2007") started on February 24, 2007.

Clausura 2007 teams

Team information

Personnel and sponsoring

Managerial changes

Before the season

During the season

Apertura 2006 standings
Last updated December 4, 2006

Top scorers

Bracket

Semifinals 1st Leg

Semifinals 2nd Leg

Final

List of foreign players in the league
This is a list of foreign players in Clausura 2007. The following players:
have played at least one apetura game for the respective club.
have not been capped for the El Salvador national football team on any level, independently from the birthplace

A new rule was introduced this season that clubs can only have three foreign players per club and can only add a new player if there is an injury or player/s is released.

C.D. Águila
  Fabio Ulloa
  Nicolás Muñoz
  Juan Ramon Solís
  Eduardo Jiménez

Alianza F.C.
  Jhonny Woodly
  Miguel Domínguez
  Anel Canales 
  Arturo Albarrán

Chalatenango
  Franklin Webster
  Marcelo Messias
  Juan Camilo Mejía
  José Eduardo Mendez

C.D. FAS
  Pedro Aguirrez
  Alejandro Bentos
  Agustin Lastagaray
  Nestor Ayala

C.D. Luis Ángel Firpo
  Hermes Martinez 
  Fernando Leguizamón
  Leonardo Pekarnik 
  Mario Alejandro Costas

 (player released mid season)
 Injury replacement player

Independiente Nacional 1906
  Alexander Obregón
  Miguel Solis
  Eider Mosquera
  Emilio Palacios

A.D. Isidro Metapán
  /  Fabinho 
  Carlos Alberto Gómez
  Paolo Suarez
  Williams Reyes

Once Municipal
  Francisco Portillo
  Jairo Hurtado
  Ernesto Noel Aquino
  Libardo Barbajal

San Salvador F.C.
  Andrés Berrueta
  Luis Espíndola
  Wilber Sánchez
  Andrés Medina

 
Vista Hermosa
  Patricio Barroche
  Cristian Mosquera
  Elder Figueroa
  Luis Torres Rodriguez

External links

https://web.archive.org/web/20070811073928/http://www.clima.com.sv/

Primera División de Fútbol Profesional Clausura seasons
El
1